The Fire Itself is the fifth studio album by American metalcore band Phinehas. The album was released on August 27, 2021, through Solid State Records. It was produced by Sean McCulloch and Daniel Gailey, the band's vocalist and guitarist. The album marks the longest gap between two albums from the band to date, spanning almost four years since Dark Flag.

Background and promotion
On August 1, 2020, Phinehas announced that it had begun writing for the album, expecting to release it in 2021. On March 27, 2021, the band posted a photo on its official Facebook page, announcing that production of the album had begun. On July 8, Phinehas released a brand new single "In the Night" and announced the album itself. At the same time, the band revealed the album cover, the track list and release date. On July 29, they debuted the second single "Eternally Apart". On August 20, one week before the album release, the band unveiled the third single and title track "The Fire Itself".

Track listing

Personnel
Credits adapted from Discogs.

Phinehas
 Sean McCulloch – lead vocals, production, engineering, artwork
 Daniel Gailey – guitars, backing vocals, production, engineering
 Bryce Kelley – bass, backing vocals
 Isaiah Perez – drums

Additional personnel
 Carson Slovak – mixing, mastering
 Grant McFarland – mixing, mastering
 Eric Powell – booking
 Adam Skatula – A&R

References

Phinehas (band) albums
2021 albums
Solid State Records albums